Megha Chakraborty is an Indian film and television actress. She has appeared in various TV serials and currently (as of 2023) plays the role of Imlie in Imlie.

Career
She started her career with the Bengali serial Joto Hashi Tato Ranna. Her big break in Hindi Television was Badii Devrani. After that, she was seen in TV shows like Khwaabon Ki Zamin Par and Peshwa Bajirao and became a household name with Krishna Chali London.

She also played the main protagonist Gulaal in the film Desert Tears which portrayed persecution of women in rural India and was shot in the state of Rajasthan.

In November 2020, she started playing the lead role of Garima Ruhail Rajawat in Kaatelal & Sons. After the show ended, she and Sahil Phull started their own production company Mismanaged Company. Her first production would be the web show Dil-e-couch where she  portrayed the role of Nima, with the series premiere on the YouTube channel "Mismanaged Company". She currently plays the role of Imlie (Imlie & ASR's daughter, after 20-year leap in the series' plot).

Personal life
Megha was born in Kolkata, West Bengal. She moved to Mumbai in 2014.

Filmography

Film

Television

Web series

Music video

References

External links

Bengali female models
Actresses in Bengali cinema
Indian film actresses
Living people
Place of birth missing (living people)
Female models from Kolkata
Actresses in Hindi television
Indian television actresses
Year of birth missing (living people)